Sandy Shaw  is a Canadian politician who was elected to the Legislative Assembly of Ontario in the 2018 provincial election. She represents the riding of Hamilton West—Ancaster—Dundas as a member of the Ontario New Democratic Party. Sandy currently serves as the Critic for Environment, Conservation and Parks.

Electoral record 

 

|- style="background-color:#fcfcfc;"
!rowspan="2" colspan="2" style="text-align:center;" |Candidate
!colspan="3" style="text-align:center;" |Popular vote
!rowspan="2" colspan="2" style="text-align:center;" |Expenditures
|- style="background-color:#fcfcfc;"
| style="text-align:center;" | Votes
| style="text-align:center;" |%
| style="text-align:center;" |±%
|-
| style="background-color:#88c759;" |
| style="text-align:left;" | Aidan Johnson
| style="text-align:right;" |3,030
| style="text-align:right;" |34.69%
| style="text-align:right;" | –
| style="text-align:right;" |$20,215.71
|-
| style="background-color:#506621;" |
| style="text-align:left;" | Sandy Shaw
| style="text-align:right;" |2,390
| style="text-align:right;" |27.36%
| style="text-align:right;" | –
| style="text-align:right;" |$21,412.40
|-
| style="background-color:#00aeea;" |
| style="text-align:left;" | Jason Allen
| style="text-align:right;" |1,050
| style="text-align:right;" |12.02%
| style="text-align:right;" | –
| style="text-align:right;" |$9,286.10
|-
| style="background-color:#0000FF;" |
| style="text-align:left;" | Tony Greco
| style="text-align:right;" |1,024
| style="text-align:right;" |11.72%
| style="text-align:right;" |−14.7%
| style="text-align:right;" | n/a1
|-
| style="background-color:#7b353c;" |
| style="text-align:left;" | Brian Lewis
| style="text-align:right;" |641
| style="text-align:right;" |7.34%
| style="text-align:right;" | –
| style="text-align:right;" |$9,101.20
|-
| style="background-color:#0000ab;" |
| style="text-align:left;" | Ira Rosen
| style="text-align:right;" |600
| style="text-align:right;" |6.87%
| style="text-align:right;" | –
| style="text-align:right;" |$14,583.76
|-
| style="text-align:right;background-color:#FFFFFF;" colspan="2" |Total votes
| style="text-align:right;background-color:#FFFFFF;" |8,870
| style="text-align:right;background-color:#FFFFFF;" |40.74%
| style="text-align:right;background-color:#FFFFFF;" |+.04%
| style="text-align:right;" |
|- 
| style="text-align:right;background-color:#FFFFFF;" colspan="2" |Registered voters
| style="text-align:right;background-color:#FFFFFF;" |21,770
| style="text-align:right;background-color:#FFFFFF;" |100%
| style="text-align:right;background-color:#FFFFFF;" |
| style="text-align:right;" |
|- 
| style="text-align:left;" colspan="6" |1 These candidates did not submit official Financial Statements and are, therefore, ineligible to run in the  2018 Municipal election  Note: All Hamilton Municipal Elections are officially non-partisan.  Note: Candidate campaign colours are based on the prominent colour used in campaign items (signs, literature, etc.)and are used as a visual differentiation between candidates.
|- 
| style="text-align:left;" colspan="13" |Sources: City of Hamilton, "Nominated Candidates"
|}

References 

Ontario New Democratic Party MPPs
21st-century Canadian politicians
21st-century Canadian women politicians
Living people
Politicians from Hamilton, Ontario
Women MPPs in Ontario
1960 births